Bower's shrikethrush (Colluricincla boweri), also known as the stripe-breasted shrike-thrush, is a species of bird in the family Pachycephalidae. It is endemic to Australia. It is found on the southeast coast of Cape York Peninsula.

Its natural habitats are subtropical or tropical moist lowland forest and subtropical or tropical moist montane forest.

References

Bower's shrikethrush
Birds of Cape York Peninsula
Endemic birds of Australia
Bower's shrikethrush
Taxonomy articles created by Polbot